γ Horologii, Latinised as Gamma Horologii, is a solitary star in the southern constellation of Horologium. It is just bright enough to be visible to the naked eye as a dim, yellow-hued point of light with an apparent visual magnitude of +5.74. This object is located at a distance of 183 light years from the Sun, but is drifting closer with a radial velocity of −19 km/s.

The stellar classification of this object is G8 III/IV, matching a G-type star with a luminosity class intermediate between a subgiant and giant star. This suggests it has exhausted the supply of hydrogen at its core and is evolving off the main sequence. It has 5.5 times the radius of the Sun and is radiating 17 times the Sun's luminosity from its swelling photosphere at an effective temperature of 4,961 K. The metallicity is sub-solar, indicating a lower abundance of elements more massive than helium, as compared to the Sun.

References

G-type subgiants
G-type giants
Horologium (constellation)
Durchmusterung objects
017504
012871
0833